Rudolf Olgiati (Chur, 7 September 1910 – Flims, 25 September 1995) was a Swiss architect. Olgiati is known for his work with Alfred Werner Maurer on the French Riviera, and has had some of his more notable work exhibited in the 1977 ETH Zürich.

Biography
Olgiatis father was Oreste Olgiati; a lawyer and citizen of Poschiavo and Chur. In 1927, Olgiati graduated from the Grisons Canton School in Chur. He then studied at the Swiss Federal Institute of Technology Zurich, where he graduated in 1934, with Josef Zemp, in art history. Rudolf Olgiati worked as an architect, first in Zürich and starting in 1944 in Flims, where he had purchased a house back in 1930 and then proceeded to renovate it making it the family home. His son Valerio Olgiati is also active as an architect and lives in Flims in his father's house.

Basic features of his work
Rudolf Olgiati was a representative of the New Objectivity movement and one of the first architects in the mid-1950s to discover the importance and effectiveness of historical design principles for the architecture of modernity. Olgiati mainly built family houses in the mountainous region of Grisons, Switzerland, and restored old farmhouses and patrician houses, later also designed buildings in southern France and Germany together with Alfred Werner Maurer.

Olgiati's cubical use of forms moved between the priorities of Grison's local architectural tradition, the ancient Greek style, and modernism mainly oriented on Le Corbusier. Thus, Olgiati was striving  for a universal, timeless, and radically modern architecture, equally documenting the influence of international architecture as well as the indigenous Swiss architecture; thereby always remaining aware of its ideological and formal context. With Olgiati, who never considered the use of traditional elements as restorative, architecture  is combined with local traditions and with the place as such, which he claimed to remodel by creating an intimate relationship between the architecture and the local residents.

Olgiati's work has been exhibited in 1977 at ETH Zürich, in 1986 at the Free Academy of the Arts in Hamburg, in 1986 at the Technical University of Berlin, and in 1988 at the Art University Linz, Austria. In 1981, Olgiati received the Cultural Prize of the Canton of Grisons.

Works
 Casa Matta, Flims-Waldhaus 1955
 Apartment House Las Caglias, Flims-Waldhaus 1959-1960
 House B. Savoldelli (orig. D. Witzig), Flims-Waldhaus 1966
 House van der Ploeg Lavanuz, Laax 1966-1967
 House van Heusden Lavanuz, Laax 1967-1968
 House Dr. Allemann, Unterwasser Wildhaus, 1968-1969
 Residential development "Cittadeta" Savognin, competition 1971
 Multi-family house Casa Radulff, Flims-Waldhaus 1971-1972
 Apartment house "Amiez", remodeled factory to residential building, Flims-Dorf 1971-1977
 Handelsgärtnerei Urech, Chur 1972-1973
 House Rogosky, Mercantale, Tuscany, Italy, 1972-1973
 Apartments for elderly and small apartments "Candrian", Sagens, 1974
 Tschaler House, Chur 1974-1977
 House Dr. Schorta, Tamins 1975-1976
 House Weiss, Kaltenbach TG 1978-1979
 Villa Sarraz,  Les Issambres, Côte d’Azur, France, 1986-1989, with A.W. Maurer
 House Casutt Ilanz 1984
 Casutt Hotel, remodeling of restaurant, Ilanz 1986
 House G. Rensch (orig. Dr. Thoma), Walenstadt 1988
 House Winterberg, Saarbrücken 1988-1989, with A.W. Maurer
 Renovation of house 'Schlössli' Morissen, 1989–1991
 Apartment house Bebié, Morissen, 1990
 House Dr. Bühlmann, Hilterfingen BE, 1993

Projects
 School system "prism" Schamserberg, Donath competition 1976
 Redevelopment of downtown Chur 1980-1982
 Buendner Musée d'Art Chur, competition 1982
 Theater and museum, Flims-Dorf, competition 1987
 Annex, Tower Books and Art Gallery Saarbrücken 1988-1989, with A. W. Maurer 
 Terrace House in Saarbrücken in 1988, with A. W. Maurer
 Cultural Center Yellow House Flims-Dorf, competition 1992-1994
 Tourist center valley, Flims-Dorf 1994
 Olgiati Musée, Flims-Waldhaus 1994, 1996

Bibliography
 Josef Kremerskothen: Rudolf Olgiati. In: Grosse Architekten. Menschen, die Baugeschichte machten. 9. Auflage. Gruner und Jahr, Hamburg 1999, S. 231 ff.
 Thomas Boga (ed.): Die Architektur von Rudolf Olgiati. Ausstellung vom 16. Juni bis 7. Juli 1977 am Hönggerberg der ETH Zürich. 3. Auflage. Organisationsstelle für Architekturausstellungen, Zürich 1983, .
 Ursula Riederer: Rudolf Olgiati: Bauen mit den Sinnen. HTW, Chur 2004, .
 Rudolf Olgiati: Eine Streitschrift. Magazin und Buch, Stuttgart 1994. .
 Hrsg. Selina Walder: Dado: Gebaut und bewohnt von Rudolf Olgiati und Valerio Olgiati. Birkhäuser Verlag, Basel 2010, .
 Thomas Boga (ed.): Rudolf Olgiati. Birkhäuser Verlag, Basel 2009  
 Alfred Werner Maurer: Villa Sarraz Côte d'Azur France, Philologus Verlag Basel, 2013

References

External links
  - Olgiati-Museum website
 
 Marjorie-Wiki from Villa Sarraz

ETH Zurich alumni
1910 births
1995 deaths
20th-century Swiss architects
People from Chur